Kourtesi (Greek: Κουρτέσι) is a village and a community in the southwestern part of the municipal unit of Vouprasia, Elis, Greece. It is in a flat rural area, southeast of the Kotychi lagoon, 7 km southwest of Varda in the northeast, 1 km east of Areti and 7 km northeast of Lechaina. Kourtesi lies on the Greek National Road 9 connecting Patras and Pyrgos, and on the railway from Patras to Pyrgos. The community consists of the villages Kourtesi, Ano Kourtesi and Kotteika. The smaller villages Ano Kourtesi and Kotteika lie to the southeast of Kourtesi.

See also
List of settlements in Elis

References

External links
GTP - Kourtesi

Populated places in Elis